Bahadur Bhawan (initially known as Char Burja Durbar) is a Rana palace in Kathmandu, the capital of Nepal. The palace complex, located west of Jamal, north of Keshar Mahal was incorporated in an impressive and vast array of courtyards, gardens and buildings. Initially the palace was built by Bir Shumsher JBR and was rebuilt by Rudra Shumsher JBR after its destruction by fire in BS 1962.

History
The palace complex lay in the heart of Kathmandu, to the north of the Thamel and North of Naachghar.

Under Rana
The Char Burg Durbar was built by Bir Shumsher JBR as a private residence in a property of 180 Ropanis. Immediately after construction Bir Shumsher handed this property to his third son Rudra Shumsher JBR, who moved to this palace after Bir Shumsher JBR's death in 1959 BS.

In 1962 BS Char Burg Durbar was severely damaged after having caught fire. Re-construction of this palace started in the same year by the same architect Jog Lal Sthaphit on the same old foundation. During this new construction four Burg were constructed thus naming it Char Burg Durbar which literally translates Four Burg Palace. 

In 1990 BS Rudra Shumsher JBR was exiled to Palpa by Juddha Shumsher JBR  thus occupying Char Burg Durbar and gave it to his second son Bahadur Shumsher JBR. Later Bahadur Shumsher renamed it Bahadur Bhawan.

Hotel Royal
In 2007 BS (1950 AD) after the fall of Rana Regime Prince Basundhara Bir Bikram Shah bought Bahadur Bhawan for 18 million Nepali Rupees and along with the Russian national Boris Lisanevich established Nepal’s first luxury hotel, Hotel Royal. There is a record of Hotel Royal being used by visitors to the Coronation of Mahendra of Nepal on Feb 12, 1959.

Under Government of Nepal
After being unsuccessful in business Prince Basundhara Bir Bikram Shah sold Bahadur Bhawan to the government of Nepal. Currently the palace is occupied by Office of the Vice President and The Election Commission.

Earthquake 2015
Bahadur Bhawan suffered minor damage during the April 2015 Nepal earthquake and was designated safe and received a yellow sticker.  The Office of the Vice President and the Election Commission may have to move because the rear of the building was heavily damaged, with cracks in the ceilings and walls. The future of the historic building is unknown.

See also
Babar Mahal
Thapathali Durbar
Boris Lisanevich

References

Palaces in Kathmandu
Rana palaces of Nepal